The 2009 Polish Figure Skating Championships were held in three parts:
 Senior competitions were held as a part of 2009 Three National Championships in Třinec, Czech Republic on December 5–6, 2008.
 Junior competitions were held in Cieszyn between January 30 and February 1, 2009. Children from Gold and Silver categories had their Cup of Poland competition (equivalent of Polish National Championships) at the same time.
 Novice competitions were held in Oświęcim on April 3–5, 2009, with Bronze and Pre-Bronze children in Cup of Poland at the same time. Junior synchro skated with them, as well.

Younger than Senior Polish skaters also started in the Czech Republic but the competition did not have the character of National Championships for them.

Senior results

The Three National Championships were held simultaneously and the results were then split by country. The top three skaters from each country formed their national podiums.

Men

Ladies

Pairs

Ice dancing

Junior results

Men

Ladies

Pairs

Ice dancing

Synchronized

Novice results

Men

Ladies

Pairs

Ice dancing

Synchronized

External links
 Senior level results
 Junior level results
 Novice level results

Polish Figure Skating Championships
2008 in figure skating
Polish Figure Skating Championships, 2009
2008 in Czech sport
Polish Figure Skating Championships, 2009